Teresa, is a 2010 Equatoguinean drama short film directed by Thato Rantao Mwosa and produced by National Library of Equatorial Guinea. The film was written by Guillermina Mekuy Mba Obono, Secretary of State for Libraries, Archives, Museums and Movie Theaters. The film stars Elena Iyanga, Betty K.B., and Dina Anguesomo in main roles. It is the first medium-length film produced in Equatorial Guinea. 

The film rotates around the teen life of three students: Teresa, Rocío and Yolanda influenced by real events. The film has its premier at Spanish Cultural Center of Malabo (CCEM) and in the Cultural Institute of French Expression of Malabo (ICEF). The film received critical acclaim and won several awards at international film festivals.

Cast
 Elena Iyanga as Teresa
 Betty K.B.
 Dina Anguesomo

References

External links
 

2010 films
Equatoguinean drama films
2010 short films
Equatoguinean short films